Ceplenița is a commune in Iași County, Western Moldavia, Romania. It is composed of four villages: Buhalnița, Ceplenița, Poiana Mărului and Zlodica.

References

Communes in Iași County
Localities in Western Moldavia